<noinclude>

Mexico is a state in central Mexico that is divided into 125 municipalities. According to the 2020 Mexican Census, it is the most populated state with  inhabitants and the 8th smallest by land area spanning .

Municipalities in the State of Mexico are administratively autonomous of the state according to the 115th article of the 1917 Constitution of Mexico. Every three years, citizens elect a municipal president (Spanish: presidente municipal) by a plurality voting system who heads a concurrently elected municipal council (ayuntamiento) responsible for providing all the public services for their constituents. The municipal council consists of a variable number of trustees and councillors (regidores y síndicos). Municipalities are responsible for public services (such as water and sewerage), street lighting, public safety, traffic, and the maintenance of public parks, gardens and cemeteries. They may also assist the state and federal governments in education, emergency fire and medical services, environmental protection and maintenance of monuments and historical landmarks. Since 1984, they have had the power to collect property taxes and user fees, although more funds are obtained from the state and federal governments than from their own income.

The largest municipality by population is Ecatepec, with 1,645,352 residents (9.68% of the state's total), while the smallest is Papalotla with 4,862 residents. The newest municipalities are Luvianos and San José del Rincón, established on January 1, 2002; and Tonanitla, created on July 25, 2003.

Municipalities

Notes

References

External links
Map of municipalities Municipalities of the State of Mexico (in Spanish)

 
Mexico